Flayosc (Provençal Occitan: Flaiòsc) is a commune in the Var department in the Provence-Alpes-Côte d'Azur region in Southeastern France. In 2019, it had a population of 4,247.

Geography 

The town is located on a rocky hill, near the church. Three small rivers crosses the village : the Pontchalade, the Florieyes and the Rimalte.

History

Antiquity 

The place allowed local residents to watch over the valley and to protect villages in the neighbourhood, for example Saint-Lambert (far from 5 km).

After the destruction of Antea, a village in the neighbourhood, by the Roman Empire, people decided to live in this place.

Since 1789 

The lord of Flayosc lost his powers and his castle during the French Revolution.

In the 19th century, the village became a place where shoes were made : many factories were created.  The village had, thanks to this activity, a long prosperous period. About 3,000 people lived in Flayosc in 1914.

Natural patrimony, fauna and flora 

The village is classified in Zone Natura 2000 and in Zone Naturelle d'Intérêt Ecologique, Faunistique et Floristique.

Twin towns 

  Vezza d'Oglio since 2002

Bibliography 

 Charles-Laurent Salch, Dictionnaire des châteaux et fortifications de la France au Moyen Âge, ed. Publitotal, reprint 1991, page 478.

See also 

 Communes of the Var department
 Draguignan

References

External links
  Statistics
   Local council of Flayosc
  Map of Flayosc
  Architectural patrimony on the site of French Ministry of culture
  Protected patrimony of Flayosc
  Site of the regional Office of Ecology

Communes of Var (department)
French Riviera